The sawspine catfish (Neoarius pectoralis), alternatively referred to as the sawspined catfish, is a species of catfish in the family Ariidae. It was described by Patricia J. Kailola in 2000, originally under the genus Arius. It inhabits marine and brackish waters in Australia, Irian Jaya, and possibly also Papua New Guinea.

The species epithet "pectoralis" derived from the Latin term for "shoulder", was inspired by the prominent, flattened serrae along the spine of the inner pectoral fin on the species.

References

Ariidae
Fish described in 2000